Shulamith is the second studio album by American indie pop band Poliça, released on October 18, 2013 by Mom + Pop Music.

Background and development
The album title refers to the radical feminist Shulamith Firestone whose book The Dialectic of Sex was the main inspiration to singer and lyricist Channy Leaneagh after the recording of the album. Describing Firestone as "This woman to me is like my pop star. I want to try and be more like her," Leaneagh insisted that the name wasn't chosen "because I wanted to make a statement about feminism." At the same time, themes explored in the album dovetail with feminist concerns such as the conflict of desire and frustration that attend living up to cultural ideals as well as the pitfalls of materialism and perfectionism.

"Tiff" was released as the album's lead single on April 15, 2013. An expanded/deluxe edition of the album was released on 10 June 2014. The edition contained four new tracks by the band; include "Raw Exit", which the band demoed a little after the release of their debut, Give You the Ghost. The track was never officially released but the band played at concerts. These four tracks were also made available in the form of Raw Exit EP, Leaneagh stated in their blog: "'Raw Exit' still sounds like Poliça but goes to a different place topically than the rest of Shulamith—it's about wanting someone, which is rare in our songs." The EP was also released as a 10" vinyl record.

Album cover
The cover of the album features a bust-length view of a young Caucasian woman against a royal blue background and turned away from the spectator at a 45 degree angle. Her long brown hair appears wet and is wrapped around the left side of her neck to expose the right side that is stained with a deep red liquid. The red substance stains her right ear and hairline as well as parts of her upper back. The ambiguity of the image - is it blood or hair dye? - played a role in its censorship on iTunes, among other music retailers. When asked about the censorship, Leneagh replied in this way:
"It's a very violent society that we live in, so I was confused when the image on our cover was censored. You look on iTunes and there's some really violent-sounding music. My music isn't really that, I don't have anything specifically violent about my music. That cover was exploring the life of a woman that's a mix of blood and beauty and the brutal existence of a woman. A lot of the covers on iTunes are just a face of the singer. Not like everybody has to have a message on their record cover, but it just infuriates me that iTunes is dumbing down the opportunity for musicians to have a voice."

Track listing

Personnel
Credits adapted from the liner notes of Shulamith.

Poliça
 Poliça – production
 Channy Leaneagh – vocals
 Chris Bierden – bass, harmony vocals
 Drew Christopherson – drums
 Ben Ivascu – drums
 Ryan Olson – beats programming, production, synth

Additional personnel
 BJ Burton – engineering, mixing
 Isaac Gale – back photography, cover
 Michael Gaughan – watercolor painting
 Andrea Hyde – design
 Huntley Miller – mastering

Charts

Release history

References

2013 albums
Mom + Pop Music albums
Poliça albums